The sixth season of Blue Bloods, a police procedural drama series created by Robin Green and Mitchell Burgess, premiered on CBS September 25, 2015. Leonard Goldberg serves as executive producer. The season contained 22 episodes.

On May 11, 2015, CBS renewed Blue Bloods for a sixth season.

Cast
Donnie Wahlberg (Danny Reagan), Bridget Moynahan (Erin Reagan), Will Estes (Jamie Reagan), and Len Cariou (Henry Reagan) are first credited. Amy Carlson (Linda Reagan) and Sami Gayle (Nicky Reagan-Boyle) are credited next, marking the second season they have been included in the opening credits. Tom Selleck (Frank Reagan) receives an "and" billing at the close of the main title sequence.

Marisa Ramirez, as Danny's partner Detective Maria Baez, and Vanessa Ray, as Jamie's partner Eddie Janko, continue to receive "also starring" billing for season 6. Appearing regularly and receiving "special guest star" billing are Gregory Jbara as Deputy Commissioner of Public Information Garrett Moore, Robert Clohessy as Lt. Sidney Gormley, and Abigail Hawk as Detective Baker, Frank's primary aide.

Main cast 
Tom Selleck as Police Commissioner Francis "Frank" Reagan
Donnie Wahlberg as Detective 1st Grade Daniel "Danny" Reagan
Bridget Moynahan as ADA Erin Reagan
Will Estes as Officer Jamison "Jamie" Reagan
Len Cariou as Henry Reagan
Amy Carlson as Linda Reagan
Sami Gayle as Nicole "Nicky" Reagan-Boyle
Marisa Ramirez as Detective 1st Grade Maria Baez 
Vanessa Ray as Officer Edit "Eddie" Janko

Recurring cast 
Abigail Hawk as Detective 1st Grade Abigail Baker
Gregory Jbara as Deputy Commissioner of Public Information Garrett Moore
Robert Clohessy as Lieutenant Sidney "Sid" Gormley
Steve Schirripa as DA Investigator Anthony Abetemarco
Nicholas Turturro as Sargeant Anthony Renzulli 
Ato Essandoh as Reverend Darnell Potter 
Tony Terraciano as Jack Reagan  
Andrew Terraciano as Sean Regan

Special Guest Star

Whoopi Goldberg as Regina Thomas

Episodes

Ratings

References

External links

2015 American television seasons
2016 American television seasons
Blue Bloods (TV series)